The Campania regional election of 2005 took place on 3–4 April 2005.

Antonio Bassolino (Democrats of the Left, then Democratic Party) was re-elected defeating Italo Bocchino (National Alliance) by a landslide.

Results

Elections in Campania
2005 elections in Italy